The House of Commons Standing Committee on Official Languages (LANG) is a standing committee of the House of Commons of Canada.

Mandate
The review of official language policies and programs
Review of reports of the Commissioner of Official Languages

Membership

Subcommittees
Subcommittee on Agenda and Procedure (SLAN)

External links
 Standing Committee on Official Languages (LANG)

Official languages
Bilingualism in Canada